Namibia held two subnational elections in 2004. Local Authority Council elections were held on 14 May 2004.  Regional Council elections were held 29–30 November 2004.

Results

Local Authority Councils
In the regions of Helao Nafidi and Outapi only the South West Africa People's Organization (SWAPO) fielded any candidates, so no elections were held and all SWAPO candidates were declared elected.

Regional Councils

References

Local and regional elections in Namibia
2004 in Namibia
Namibia
May 2004 events in Africa